Hersey is an unincorporated community located in the town of Springfield, St. Croix County, Wisconsin, United States.

History
A post office called Hersey was established in 1873, and remained in operation until it was discontinued in 1954. The community was named for Samuel F. Hersey, a partner in a logging firm based in Stillwater, Minnesota.

References

Unincorporated communities in St. Croix County, Wisconsin
Unincorporated communities in Wisconsin